Allen Sutton Sothoron (April 27, 1893 – June 17, 1939) was an American professional baseball player, coach and manager. As a player, he was a spitball pitcher who spent 11 years in the major leagues playing for the St. Louis Browns, Boston Red Sox, Cleveland Indians and the St. Louis Cardinals. He attended Albright College and Juniata College.

Sportswriters frequently misspelled Sothoron's given name (as "Allan") and family name (as "Southern", among other variations) and some sources continue to refer to him as "Allan," although his personal documents show his preference for Allen.

Career
Sothoron broke into the major leagues when the spitball was still legal. His best season came in 1919, when he posted a 20–13 record with a 2.20 earned run average for the Browns, finishing fifth in the American League in wins and ERA. After the spitball was outlawed following the 1919 campaign, Sothoron at first was not permitted to throw it, then in mid-1920 he was added to a list of 17 spitballers in the majors who were allowed to continue using the banned pitch. But he was never able to match his 1919 numbers. During his MLB career, he appeared in 264 games pitched, and allowed 1,583 hits and 596 bases on balls in  innings pitched. He struck out 576 and hurled 102 complete games.

In 1921, sportswriter Bugs Baer came up with this immortal quip: "Allen S. Sothoron pitched his initials off yesterday."

After his playing days, Sothoron managed in minor league baseball, coached for the Cardinals (1927), Boston Braves (1928), and Browns (1932–1933), and with the 1933 Browns he served a brief, eight-game managerial stint after the dismissal of Bill Killefer.  After compiling a win–loss record of 2–6 between July 19 and July 27, he was replaced with hometown favorite Rogers Hornsby.

Sothoron died in St. Louis at age 46 in the middle of the 1939 season after a series of illnesses. He is interred at Woodlawn Cemetery in the Bronx, New York City.

Managerial record

References

External links

1893 births
1939 deaths
Albright Lions baseball players
Baseball players from Ohio
Boston Braves coaches
Boston Red Sox players
Cleveland Indians players
Haverhill Hustlers players
Juniata Eagles baseball players
Louisville Colonels (minor league) managers
Louisville Colonels (minor league) players
Major League Baseball pitchers
Milwaukee Brewers (minor league) managers
People from Bradford, Ohio
Portland Beavers players
St. Louis Browns coaches
St. Louis Browns managers
St. Louis Browns players
St. Louis Cardinals coaches
St. Louis Cardinals players
Wichita Witches players
Burials at Woodlawn Cemetery (Bronx, New York)